The Wright Pathfinder is a low entry and low floor single-decker bus body built on Dennis Lance SLF and Scania N113CRL chassis by Wrightbus between 1993 and 1995.

History
Of the 95 Pathfinders produced, London Regional Transport subsidiaries purchased 38 on Dennis Lance chassis and all 30 Scania N113CRLs. They were London's first low-floor buses. The first examples were operated by London United on route 120 and CentreWest on route 222.

Other purchasers (all on Dennis Lances) included Badgerline, London & Country and Northern General. The Pathfinder was succeeded in 1995 by the Axcess-Ultralow.

References

 Millar, Alan (2007) Bus & Coach Recognition : Ian Allan Ltd.,

External links

Low-entry buses
Low-floor buses
Vehicles introduced in 1993
Pathfinder